Harry Morton Fitzpatrick (27 June 1886 – 8 December 1949), was an American mycologist. He was professor of mycology at Cornell. He is known for his work on the Phycomycetes. His book on the Lower Fungi was the standard text and reference work on the Phycomycetes. He trained Clark Thomas Rogerson and Richard P. Korf, two prominent mycologists.

Biography 
Harry Morton Fitzpatrick was born on June 27, 1886, in Greenwood, Indiana. He attended high school in 
Crawfordsville, Indiana, where he became acquainted with mycologist Herbert Hice Whetzel, then a student at 
Wabash College, who stimulated his interest in mycology. In 1905, he entered Wabash College, where Professor Mason B. Thomas, a great teacher of botany, would further influence Fitzpatrick to study mycology. Encouraged by Whetzel, then Professor at Cornell University, and aided by Professor Thomas, he transferred to Cornell in 1908 as an assistant to Professor George Francis Atkinson in the Department of Botany and received the A.B. degree from the Arts College in 1909. He then entered the Graduate School at Cornell as an Assistant and later as an Instructor in Plant Pathology. He studied mycology under Professor Atkinson. He was awarded the Ph.D. degree in 1913. He was immediately appointed Assistant Professor by Whetzel in the recently organized Department of Plant Pathology at Cornell, and began the work of teaching mycology to which he devoted the remainder of his life. He was raised to a full Professorship in 1922.

Harry Morton Fitzpatrick died in Ithaca, New York on December 8, 1949.

Mycological contributions
Harry Morton Fitzpatrick's contributions to mycology include monographs of the Coryneliaceae and Nitschkiaceae. Fitzpatrick is best known for his influential text The Lower Fungi. Phycomycetes, which was published in 1930, and is credited for the posthumous publication of Whetzel's 1945 monograph of the Sclerotineaceae. Fitzpatrick took an active role in the founding of the Mycological Society of America (MSA) at New Orleans, Louisiana on December 29, 1931. Fitzpatrick served as the first Secretary-Treasurer of the MSA (1932–1935), as the fifth President of the MSA (1936), and as Historian of the MSA until his death. He published biographies of mycologists George Francis Atkinson, Curtis Gates Lloyd, Fred Carleton Stewart, and Herbert Hice Whetzel. He trained Clark Thomas Rogerson and Richard P. Korf, two students that would become prominent mycologists.

Taxa described
Acanthonitschkea macrobarbata Fitzp. 1923
Blastocladiales Fitzp. 1930
Caliciopsis pseudotsugae Fitzp. 1942
Caliciopsis symploci Fitzp. 1942
Calyculosphaeria Fitzp. 1923
Calyculosphaeria macrospora Fitzp. 1923
Claudopus subdepluens Fitzp. 1915
Corynelia bispora Fitzp. 1920
Corynelia brasiliensis Fitzp. 1920
Corynelia jamaicensis Fitzp. 1920
Corynelia nipponensis Fitzp. 1920
Coryneliospora Fitzp. 1942
Hysterangium stoloniferum var. americanum Fitzp. 1913
Lagenulopsis Fitzp. 1942
Nitschkia floridana Fitzp. 1923
Nitschkieae Fitzp. 1923
Rostronitschkia Fitzp. 1919
Rostronitschkia nervincola Fitzp. 1919
Thamnidiaceae Fitzp. 1930
Tripospora macrospora Fitzp. 1942
Tympanopsis uniseriata Fitzp. 1923

Honors and memberships 
In 1936, H.M. Fitzpatrick was elected as the fifth President of the Mycological Society of America.

In 1996, The Mycological Society of America established a Mentor Student Travel Award in honor of Harry Morton Fitzpatrick.

Fitzpatrick was a member of the American Association for the Advancement of Science, the Botanical Society of America, the American Phytopathological Society, the Mycological Society of America, the British Mycological Society, Sigma Xi and Phi Kappa Phi.

Eponymous taxa 

Fitzpatrickia Cif. 1928
Fitzpatrickella Benny, Samuelson & Kimbr. 1985

Selected publications
1919. Fitzpatrick, H.M. Rostronitschkia, a new genus of pyrenomycetes. Mycologia 11: 163-167, 1 plate.
1920. Fitzpatrick, H.M.  Monograph of the Coryneliaceae. Mycologia 12: 206-237, 239-267, 7 plates.
1923. Fitzpatrick, H.M.  Monograph of the Nitschkieae. Mycologia 15: 23-44, 7 plates.
1923. Fitzpatrick, H.M. Monograph of the Nitschkieae. Mycologia 15: 23-67, 7 plates.
1923. Fitzpatrick, H.M. Monograph of the Nitschkieae. Mycologia 15 (2): 45-67.
1923. Fitzpatrick, H.M. Generic concepts in the Pythiaceae and Blastocladiaceae. Mycologia 15: 166-173.
1927. Fitzpatrick, H.M. A mycological survey of Puerto Rico and the Virgin Island (Review). Mycologia 19: 144-149.
1930. Fitzpatrick, H.M. The Lower Fungi. Phycomycetes. 331 pp. UK, London; McGraw Hill Publishing Co. Ltd.
1942. Fitzpatrick, H.M. Revisionary studies in the Coryneliaceae. Mycologia 34 (4): 464-488.
1942. Fitzpatrick, H.M. Revisionary studies in the Coryneliaceae. II. The genus Caliciopsis. Mycologia 34 (5): 489-514.
1943. Fitzpatrick, H.M. Note. Persoon, C.H. Icones pictae specierum rariorum fungorum. Mycologia 35: 256-257.
1951. Fitzpatrick, H.M. Notes on Corynelia oreophila (Speg.) Starb. and closely related species. Mycologia 43: 437-444, 11 figs.

References

American mycologists
Cornell University alumni
1886 births
1949 deaths